Trailokya (Kannada: ತ್ರೈಲೋಕ್ಯ; , Tibetan: khams gsum;) literally means "three worlds" It can also refer to "three spheres," "three planes of existence," "three realms" and "three regions."

Conceptions of three worlds (tri-loka) appear in Hinduism and Jainism, as well as early Buddhist texts.

Hindu cosmology 

The concept of three worlds has a number of different interpretations in Hindu cosmology. 

 Traditionally, the three worlds refer to either the earth (Bhuloka), heaven (Svarga), and hell (Naraka), or the earth (Bhuloka), heaven (Svarga), and the netherworld (Patala)
 The Brahmanda Purana conceives them to be Bhūta (past), Bhavya (future), and Bhavat (present) 
 In Vaishnavism, the three worlds are often described to be bhūr, bhuvaḥ, and svaḥ (the gross region, the subtle region, and the celestial region)
 In the Nilanamatapurana, Vamana covers his second step on the three worlds of Maharloka, Janaloka, and Tapoloka, all of which are regarded to be a part of the seven heavens

Buddhist cosmology 

In Buddhism, the three worlds refer to the following destinations for karmic rebirth:
 Kāmaloka the world of desire, typified by base desires, populated by hell beings, preta (hungry ghosts), animals, humans and lower demi-gods.
 Rūpaloka is the world of form, predominantly free of baser desires, populated by dhyāna-dwelling gods, possible rebirth destination for those well practiced in dhyāna.
 Arūpaloka is the world of formlessness, a noncorporeal realm populated with four heavens, possible rebirth destination for practitioners of the four formlessness stages.

See also 
Svarga
Loka
Six Paths
Trikaya
Trilok (Jainism)

Notes

Sources 
 Berzin, Alexander (March 6, 2008). Berzin Archives Glossary.  Retrieved Sunday July 13, 2008 from "Berzin Archives" at http://www.berzinarchives.com/web/en/about/glossary/glossary_tibetan.html.
 Blavatsky, H.P. (1892). Theosophical Glossary. London: Theosophical Publishing Society.  Retrieved 2008-07-14 from "The Theosophical Glossary (United Lodge of Theosophists, Phoenix, Arizona)" at http://theosophicalglossary.net/.
 Fischer-Schreiber, Ingrid, Franz-Karl Ehrhard, Michael S. Diener and Michael H. Kohn (trans.) (1991). The Shambhala Dictionary of Buddhism and Zen. Boston: Shambhala Publications. .
 Monier-Williams, Monier (1899, 1964). A Sanskrit-English Dictionary. London: Oxford University Press. . Retrieved 2008-07-13 from "Cologne University" at http://www.sanskrit-lexicon.uni-koeln.de/scans/MWScan/index.php?sfx=pdf.
 Purucker, G. de (ed.-in-chief) (1999). Encyclopedic Theosophical Glossary: A Resource on Theosophy. Theosophical University Press. Retrieved from "The Theosophical Society" at http://www.theosociety.org/pasadena/etgloss/etg-hp.htm.
 Rhys Davids, T.W. & William Stede (eds.) (1921-5). The Pali Text Society’s Pali–English Dictionary. Chipstead: Pali Text Society. Retrieved 2008-07-13 from "U. Chicago" at http://dsal.uchicago.edu/dictionaries/pali/.
 W. E. Soothill & L. Hodous (1937-2000). A Dictionary of Chinese Buddhist Terms.  Delhi: Motilal Banarsidass.  .

External links 
 Bullitt, John T. (2005). The Thirty-one Planes of Existence. Retrieved 2007-04-30 from "Access to Insight" at http://www.accesstoinsight.org/ptf/dhamma/sagga/loka.html.
 31 Planes of Existence by Bhante Acara Suvanno
 31 Planes of Existence - chart

Buddhist philosophical concepts
Theosophical philosophical concepts
Locations in Hindu mythology
Buddhist cosmology